Sultanay (Soltanay) is a rural locality (a village) in Yevbulyaksky Selsoviet, Askinsky District, Bashkortostan, Russia. The population was 243 as of 2010. There are 3 streets.

Geography 
Sultanay is located 10 km southwest of Askino (the district's administrative centre) by road. Kushkul is the nearest rural locality.

References 

Rural localities in Askinsky District